FC Mulhouse Basket or simply Mulhouse is a French basketball club playing in National 2 (basketball) (fourth division championship of France) during the 2011–2012 season. The club is based in the commune of Mulhouse, in eastern France, close to the Swiss and German borders.

The women's section also became known in the elite of basketball in the early 1990s.

History
It was in the 1920s that basketball was born in Mulhouse. At the time, it still plays with berets, free throws are the spoon and the ball is heavy and laced leather! But then, in those years, Mulhouse dominates the French basketball. Foyer alsacien Mulhouse won the national title in 1924, 1925 and 1926, losing the following year but recovered in 1928 to never let go before 1932! In 1935 and in 1937 and 1938, it is the other club of Mulhouse, Mulhousien, who won the title. Basketball is played at the time with 8 players on the field and a great rivalry is born between these two leading Mulhouse clubs.

The club was born in 1949 from the merger of the prestigious Foyer alsacien Mulhouse and the "Espérance de Mulhouse". The new entity will be denominated "Mulhouse Basketball Club" (MBC). In 1970, became a new merger with "GENS Mulhouse" which relegated from National 2 to National 4. Then accesses Club in National 3 at the end of his first season, then National 2 (1974) with the title of champion of France National 3. When Carmine Calzonetti arrived as coach in 1976, the club rises to Nationale 1 (1st division) in 1978.  During the 1980s, Jean-Luc Monschau became president of the club. Gradually the club, accustomed to the depths of the championship, up the slope and anchors the play-off. In 1989 Mulhouse led by Philip Szanyiel and Jean-Aimé Toupane (both they came from Monaco), won the Tournoi des As against Pitch Cholet and acquired its shareholding in the European Cup Winners' Cup of the next year. Alsο, MBC participated for two consecutive years in the FIBA Korać Cup and reached the semifinals in 1991, where they eliminated by the Italian declining powerhouse Clear Cantù. This year (1991) saw in Mulhouse the arrival of Joe "JellyeBean" Bryant, father of the NBA star Kobe Bryant aged 13 to time.

At the end of the next season, the club is demoted to National A2 for financial reasons. MBC disappears from the A1 and renamed to FCM Basket (FC Mulhouse Basket). FCM was administratively relegated (due to deficit in 1994) before climbing again all levels of the championship. In three years, the club goes back to three divisions for a return to Pro B in 1997. FCM Basketball connects the good and less good result and fails to climb in Pro A.

In 2006–2007, the club, too inconsistent and lack of wins is relegated to National 1.

In November 2007, the club drops the Balance Sheet1. Late 2008, the club was relegated in sporting Nationale 2. But without the necessary financial support, the club obliged to declare bankruptcy. So it restarts in pre-national for 2008/2009 season, a very difficult season, where the club is saved in the last game.

For 2009/2010, the club gives new ambitions under the leadership of a new staff. The revival is running under the name of Mulhouse Basket, with the accession in National 3.

2009/2010, Mulhouse Basket project is abandoned, but the adventure continues in National 3 under the name and colors of FCM Basket. 2010/2011, the senior team finished undefeated in the league and rises in National 2.

Honours and titles
Total titles: 2

Domestic 
French Cup
 Runners-up (1): 1952–53
Tournament of Aces
 Winners (1): 1989
French League 2
 Winners (1): 1977–78

European 
FIBA Saporta Cup
 Quarterfinalist (1): 1989–90
FIBA Korać Cup:
 Semifinalist (1): 1990–91

Notable players

  Philip Szanyiel
 - Joe Dawson

Head coaches 
 1972–1975 :  Marcel Rinner
 1975–1978 :  Carmine Calzonetti
 1978–1979 :  Serge Kalember
 1979–1980 :  Rudy D'Amico
 1980–1981 :  Jean Racz
 1981–1983 :  Jean Galle
 1983–01/1985 :  Barry White
 01/1985–06/1985 :  Serge Kalember
 1985–1991:  Jean-Luc Monschau
 1991–1992:  Chris Singleton
 1992–1993:  Patrick Schlegel
 1993–1994:  Francis Jordane
 1994–1998:  Patrick Schlegel
 1998–2002:  Jamel Benabid
 2002–2002:  Philip Szanyiel
 2002–2004:  Jacques Vernerey
 2004–2006:  Charlie Auffray
 2006–2007:  Éric Bartecheky
 2007–2008:  Mike Gonsalves
 2009–2013:  Jamel Benabid

External links 
 FCM official site

References

Basketball teams in France
Basketball teams established in 1949
1949 establishments in France